Steak frites, meaning "steak [and] fries" in French, is a dish consisting of steak paired with French fries. It is commonly served in European brasseries, and is considered by some to be the national dish of Belgium, which claims to be the place of its invention.

Historically, the rump steak was commonly used for this dish. More typically at the present time, the steak is an entrecôte also called rib eye, or scotch fillet (in Australia), pan-fried rare ("saignant"—literally "bloody"), in a pan reduction sauce, sometimes with hollandaise or béarnaise sauce, served with deep-fried potatoes (French fries).

Steak frites is also common in other countries, such as Anglophone and Spanish-speaking Latin American countries.

Steak frites is the subject of a semiotic analysis by the French cultural theorist Roland Barthes in his 1957 work Mythologies.

See also 

 Café de Paris sauce
 Moules-frites
 L'Entrecôte
 Brasserie

Notes

References

British cuisine
French cuisine
Belgian cuisine
Beef dishes
Potato dishes
Meat and potatoes dishes